16th Online Film Critics Society Awards
2013

Best Picture: 
 Argo 
The nominations for the 16th Online Film Critics Society Awards, honoring the best in film for 2012, were announced on 24 December 2012. The winners were announced on Monday, December 31.

Winners and nominees

Best Picture
Argo
Holy Motors
The Master
Moonrise Kingdom
Zero Dark Thirty

Best Director
Paul Thomas Anderson – The Master
Ben Affleck – Argo
Wes Anderson – Moonrise Kingdom
Kathryn Bigelow – Zero Dark Thirty
Leos Carax – Holy Motors

Best Actor
Daniel Day-Lewis – Lincoln
John Hawkes – The Sessions
Denis Lavant – Holy Motors
Joaquin Phoenix – The Master
Denzel Washington – Flight

Best Actress
Jessica Chastain – Zero Dark Thirty
Jennifer Lawrence – Silver Linings Playbook
Emmanuelle Riva – Amour
Quvenzhané Wallis – Beasts of the Southern Wild
Rachel Weisz – The Deep Blue Sea

Best Supporting Actor
Philip Seymour Hoffman – The Master
Alan Arkin – Argo
Dwight Henry – Beasts of the Southern Wild
Tommy Lee Jones – Lincoln
Christoph Waltz – Django Unchained

Best Supporting Actress
Anne Hathaway – Les Misérables
Amy Adams – The Master
Ann Dowd – Compliance
Sally Field – Lincoln
Helen Hunt – The Sessions

Best Original Screenplay
Moonrise Kingdom – Wes Anderson & Roman CoppolaThe Cabin in the Woods – Joss Whedon & Drew Goddard
Looper – Rian Johnson
The Master – Paul Thomas Anderson
Zero Dark Thirty – Mark Boal

Best Adapted ScreenplayArgo – Chris TerrioBeasts of the Southern Wild – Lucy Alibar & Benh ZeitlinCloud Atlas – Lana Wachowski, Tom Tykwer & Andy WachowskiCosmopolis – David CronenbergLincoln – Tony Kushner

Best Foreign Language FilmHoly MotorsAmourRust and BoneThis Is Not a FilmThe Turin HorseBest DocumentaryThis Is Not a FilmThe ImposterThe Invisible WarJiro Dreams of SushiThe Queen of VersaillesBest Animated FeatureParaNormanBraveFrankenweenieThe Secret World of ArriettyWreck-It RalphBest Cinematography'Skyfall – Roger DeakinsLife of Pi – Claudio Miranda
Lincoln – Janusz Kamiński
The Master – Mihai Mălaimare Jr.
Moonrise Kingdom – Robert Yeoman

Best EditingCloud Atlas – Alexander Berner'Argo – William GoldenbergThe Master – Leslie Jones and Peter McNultySkyfall – Stuart BairdZero Dark Thirty'' – William Goldenberg and Dylan Tichenor

References 

2012 film awards
2012